The North Caucasian languages, sometimes called simply Caucasic, is a proposed language family consisting of a pair of well established language families spoken in the Caucasus, predominantly in the north, consisting of the Northwest Caucasian family (also called Pontic, Abkhaz–Adyghe, Circassian, or West Caucasian) and the Northeast Caucasian family (also called Nakh–Dagestanian, Caspian or East Caucasian).

The Kartvelian languages, including Georgian, Zan and Svan, were once known as South Caucasian. However, they are no longer considered related to the North Caucasian languages and are classified as an independent language family.

Some linguists, notably Sergei Starostin and Sergei Nikolaev, believe that the two groups sprang from a common ancestor about five thousand years ago. However, this proposal is difficult to evaluate, and remains controversial. There are some 34 to 38 distinct North Caucasian languages.

North Caucasian has also been given in an automated computational analysis (ASJP 4) by Müller et al. (2013). However, since the analysis was automatically generated, Müller et al. (2013) does not conclude whether the grouping is due to mutual lexical borrowing or genetic inheritance.

Internal classification
Among the linguists who support the North Caucasian hypothesis, the main split between Northeast Caucasian and Northwest Caucasian is considered uncontroversial. Problems arise when it gets to the internal structure of Northeast Caucasian itself. So far no general agreement has been reached in this respect. The following classification is based on Nikolayev & Starostin (1994):

 Abkhazo-Adyghean
 Hattic
 Nakh–Daghestanian
 Nakh
 Hurro-Urartian
 Daghestanian
 Avar–Andi–Dido
 Lezgic
 Lak–Dargwa

Comparison of the two phyla
The main perceived similarities between the two phyla lie in their phonological systems. However, their grammars are quite different.

Main similarities
Both phyla are characterised by high levels of phonetic complexity, including the widespread usage of secondary articulation. Ubykh (Northwest) has 84 consonants, and Archi (Northeast) is thought to have 76.

A list of possible cognates has been proposed. However, most of them may be loanwords or simply coincidences, since most of the morphemes in both phyla are quite short (often just a single consonant).

Main differences 
The Northeast Caucasian languages are characterised by great morphological complexity in the noun. For example, in Tsez, a series of locative cases intersect with a series of suffixes designating motion with regard to the location, producing an array of 126 locative suffixes (often – depending on the analysis – described as noun cases).

By contrast, the Northwest Caucasian noun systems are relatively poor in morphology, usually distinguishing just two or three cases. However, they make up with a very complex verbal structure: the subject, the direct object, the indirect object, benefactive objects and most local functions are expressed in the verb.

Some comparisons 

Abbreviations: PN = Proto-Nakh, PDL = Proto-Dargi-Lak, PLK = Proto-Lezgic-Khinalugh, PAAT = Proto-Avar–Andic–Tsezic, PNEC = Proto-Northeast Caucasian, PNWC = Proto-Northwest Caucasian, PNC = Proto-North Caucasian; i = inclusive, e = exclusive

Abbreviations: PNEC (S) = Schulze, PNEC (N) = Nichols, PNWC (Ch) = Chirikba, PNWC (Co) = Colarusso, PNC (S) = Starostin & Nikolayev

Criticism
Not all scholars accept the unity of the North Caucasian languages, and some who do believe that the two are, or may be, related do not accept the methodology used by Nikolayev and Starostin.<ref>Nichols, J. 1997. Nikolaev and Starostin's "North Caucasian Etymological Dictionary" and the Methodology of Long-Range Comparison: an assessment.</u> Paper presented at the 10th Biennial Non-Slavic Languages (NSL) Conference, Chicago, 8–10 May 1997.</ref>

See also
Dené–Caucasian languages

References

 
Proposed language families
Languages of the Caucasus